Ada Ogochukwu Ehi (born 18 September 1987), also simply known by her stage name Ada, is a Nigerian gospel singer, songwriter, recording and performing artist. She started her musical career at the age of 10 as a backup singer for child star Tosin Jegede. Since she professionally started her music career under Loveworld Records in 2009, she has increasingly gained local and international popularity through her songs and music videos.

Biography

Early and personal life 
Born to Victor and Mabel Ndukauba, Ehi and her three brothers grew up listening to gospel music. She is a native of Imo State in Nigeria. At 10, she was selected to be a member of the Girls band of Nigerian child star Tosin Jegede.

She is a graduate of the Lagos State University, (B.Sc Chemical and Polymer Engineering). During her university days, she actively participated in the Believers Loveworld Campus Fellowship. Shortly, she joined the Christ Embassy Choir and since then, she has been active in the church choir.

Ehi joined Loveworld Records in 2009.

She met her husband, Moses Ehi, at Christ Embassy church during one of her rehearsal sessions while still in the university. They married in 2008 and the couple have two children.

Musical career
Since joining the Christ Embassy Choir, Ehi has been actively involved in the Music Ministry of Christ Embassy, and has performed at Christ Embassy events in several programs around the world including in Europe, America and several African countries.

Her debut album Undenied was released in November 2009. Lifted and So Fly, a two-disc album, was released in November 2013. She released her third studio album, Future Now, on October 16, 2017. It claimed the number-one spot on iTunes Nigeria on the same day.

Discography

Studio albums
Undenied (2009)
Lifted (2013)
So Fly (2013)
Future Now (2017)
Ada's EP Vol 1 (2019)
Born Of God (2020)
Everything (2021)

Selected singles

Awards and recognition 
In 2017, Ehi was named on YNaijas list of "100 Influential Christian Personalities in Nigeria". She won the 2017 Groove Awards for West African Artist of the Year; being nominated alongside Frank Edwards, Sinach, Joe Praize and the Preachers. In 2019 "Only You" was listed as one of the 20 most viewed songs of the decade from Nigeria. On 26 August 2021, she received her first YouTube Plaques for reaching 1 million subscribers on YouTube.

See also
 List of Igbo people
 List of Nigerian gospel musicians
 List of Nigerian musicians

References

External links

 Ada Ehi songs

Nigerian gospel singers
Nigerian women musicians
People from Abia State
Igbo musicians
Lagos State University alumni
Nigerian women singer-songwriters
Nigerian singer-songwriters
Living people
1987 births